Ansedonia is a frazione of the comune of Orbetello, in the province of Grosseto, southern Tuscany (Italy). At the time of the 2001 census, its population was 88.

It is a renowned tourist resort. The village lies near the ruins of the ancient Roman town of Cosa.

See also 
 Albinia
 Fonteblanda
 Giannella
 San Donato, Orbetello
 Talamone

References

External links 
  

Frazioni of Orbetello
Coastal towns in Tuscany